Group B of the 2017 Rugby League World Cup is one of the four groups in the 2017 Rugby League World Cup, which  began on 28 October and was completed on 11 November 2017.  The group comprised New Zealand, Samoa, Scotland and Tonga. Tonga finished top of the pool while New Zealand and Samoa also qualified for the quarter-finals.

Overall

New Zealand vs Samoa

Scotland vs Tonga 

Notes:
 Due to high humidity conditions, the game was played with quarter-time drinks breaks after the heat rule was invoked.

New Zealand vs Scotland

Samoa vs Tonga 
In the week leading up to the match there were several "vicious street brawls" between Samoan and Tongan supporters. This led to members of both the Tongan and Samoan teams calling for calm. 29 people were arrested for fighting after the game.

New Zealand vs Tonga 
After the match, Tonga's victory was described as "the small island nation's greatest ever sporting achievement". During celebrations following the match, 53 Tongan supporters were arrested in Auckland.

Notes:
 This was New Zealand's first loss on home soil since 2012, when they lose to Australia in Auckland at Eden Park. 
 This was the first time a tier two nation had defeated Australia, England or New Zealand in a World Cup match.

Samoa vs Scotland

References

External links
 Official RLWC 2017 Site

2017 Rugby League World Cup